Verticillium albo-atrum is a plant pathogen with many hosts.

Infected plants 
See:
 List of potato diseases
 List of alfalfa diseases
 List of African daisy diseases
 List of beet diseases
 List of caneberries diseases
 List of tobacco diseases
 List of tomato diseases
 List of sunflower diseases
 List of strawberry diseases
 List of sapphire flower diseases
 List of rose diseases
 List of pocketbook plant diseases
 List of Capsicum diseases
 List of peanut diseases
 List of mint diseases
 List of mango diseases
 List of Jerusalem cherry diseases
 List of impatiens diseases
 List of hop diseases
 List of hemp diseases
 List of geranium diseases
 List of fuchsia diseases
 List of elm diseases
 List of dahlia diseases
 List of cucurbit diseases
 List of crucifer diseases
 List of cineraria diseases
 List of chickpea diseases
 List of Ficus diseases

References

External links 
 Index Fungorum
 USDA ARS Fungal Database
 Verticillium albo-atrum By: Travis DeSavigny PP 728 Soilborne Plant Pathogens North Carolina State University
 
 
 

Fungal plant pathogens and diseases
Food plant pathogens and diseases
Ornamental plant pathogens and diseases
Hypocreales incertae sedis
Fungi described in 1879